"A Hot Time in the Old Town", also titled as "There’ll Be a Hot Time in the Old Town Tonight", is an American popular song, copyrighted and perhaps composed in 1896 by Theodore August Metz with lyrics by Joe Hayden. Metz was the band leader of the McIntyre and Heath Minstrels.

Origins
One history of the song reports: "While on tour with the McIntyre and Heath Minstrels, their train arrived at a place called 'Old Town'. From their train window, [Metz] could see a group of children starting a fire, near the tracks. One of the other minstrels remarked that 'there'll be a hot time in the old town tonight'. Metz noted the remark on a scrap of paper, intending to write a march with that motif. He did indeed write the march the very next day. It was then used by the McIntyre and Heath Minstrels in their Street parades."

An alternative suggestion is that Metz first heard the tune played in about 1893 at Babe Connor's brothel, known as the Castle, in St Louis, Missouri, where it was one of the songs performed by the entertainer known as Mama Lou (or Mammy Lou), with pianist Tom Turpin.

Another alternative lists the Hub Saloon in the Grand Hotel (later renamed Imperial and today known as the Grand Imperial Hotel) in Silverton Colorado as the song's birthplace.  One source states the song might be referring to the red-light district in Cripple Creek, Colorado.

And yet one more version is Metz and his Minstrels were in Hot Springs, SD, where Joe Hayden worked at the Evans Hotel.  Hayden had the song from his "growing up" days in New Orleans, and he and Metz sat down and wrote the first version of "Hot Time" for a re-dedication ceremony for the local Chautauqua Park and Entertainment Center.  The tale is part of the 2015 book And The Wind Whispered.

According to a 1956 article in the Afro Magazine Section of the Baltimore Afro American, Mama Lou's original lyrics went: "Late last night about ten o'clock / I knocked at the door and the door was locked / I peeked through the blinds, thought my baby was dead / There was another man in the folding bed....".  Metz heard the tune, copyrighted the music in his own name, and had it incorporated into a minstrel show, Tuxedo Girls, with revised lyrics.

The dialect and narrative of the song imitate those of African-American revival meetings.

The song was referenced by the Salina Herald of Salina, Kansas, on December 31, 1891. The piece describes a fire in a Chicago hotel in which, coincidentally, the last notes played on an organ were "There'll Be a Hot Time in the Old Town, To-night." The article apparently assumed that the reader would understand the reference and tune, suggesting that the musical phrase had an earlier origin.

The Centralia Enterprise and Tribune of Centralia, Wisconsin, published a piece about a football game on March 8, 1890, placing in quotes the phrase, "there will be a hot time in the old town tomorrow tonight." Again, the placement within quotes suggests that the reader was expected to understand a reference to something else from popular culture. The song, or phrase from a song, was already part of American culture.

In popular culture

Films and musicals
The song appears as an instrumental at the very end of the New Year's Eve scene in the 1927 stage and 1936 film versions of the musical Show Boat.
It is quoted in the song "Wintergreen for President" in Of Thee I Sing (1931).
 It was the original theme song for Looney Tunes when it launched in 1930.
The song is performed in the 1936 Mae West film Klondike Annie.
The song is also featured in Citizen Kane (1941), in the line: "are we going to declare war on Spain or are we not?".
Portions of the song are heard at various points throughout John Ford's film, The Man Who Shot Liberty Valance (1962).
The Joker sings the title line from this song in a scene where he uses his "joy buzzer" to electrocute the character Antoine Rotelli in the film Batman (1989).
Catwoman directly refers to the song title as Selina Kyle, while asking Bruce Wayne if he plans to attend the tree relighting ceremony in the film Batman Returns (1992).
The melody was used for "The Chewing Song" in the Columbia Pictures film The Road to Wellville (1994).
The song features in season 1, episode 5 of the PBS Masterpiece Mystery series, Grantchester (2014). 
The song is sung by drunken ranch-hands at a saloon in the 2021 Jane Campion film, The Power of the Dog (film), set in 1925.

Military
The song was a favorite of the American military at the end of the 19th century, during the Spanish–American War and around the start of the 20th century, during the Boxer Rebellion. The tune became popular in the military after it was used as a theme by Teddy Roosevelt's Rough Riders.

Music
Bing Crosby included the song in a medley on his album Join Bing and Sing Along (1959).

Sports
The song is now frequently sung by fans of the Chicago Fire Soccer Club of Major League Soccer during matches, with lyrics reflecting the legend of Catherine O'Leary's cow's alleged role in the team's namesake, the Great Chicago Fire of 1871. The Great Fire coincidentally burned much of the Old Town, Chicago neighborhood, where the Chicago Fire Soccer Club held their first team practice in 1998 at the Moody Bible Institute.
The Western Michigan University marching band plays & sings the song as part of their pregame show.
The Eastern Illinois University marching band plays the song in conjunction with their fight song at athletic events.
The chorus is used at the University of Kansas immediately after every touchdown in football and following each basketball game, during "The Waving of the Wheat".
The song has been tradition at the University of Wisconsin since the late 1890s, when a Wisconsin-flavored arrangement was made. The University of Wisconsin Marching Band plays this arrangement regularly at sporting events, including the beginning of each period in hockey and basketball, and following touchdowns at football games. 
Prior to the adoption of "The Victors" as the University of Michigan's official fight song, it was considered to be Michigan's school song.
Texas A&M University's "Aggie War Hymn" currently uses the chorus of this song as its finale, but it is sung with different lyrics.
The song is the beginning of the UCLA victory song, "Rover", played by the UCLA Marching Band.

Television
In 1964, the song was played for laughs at a "very" slow tempo by the Hooterville Volunteer Fire Department Band on the American sitcoms Petticoat Junction and Green Acres.
The song is sung by Fozzie Bear and an ensemble (featuring some of the cast of Sesame Street) during the finale of a fifth season episode of The Muppet Show guest-starring Marty Feldman.
Richard Nixon's 1968 U.S. Presidential campaign used part of the song (set to images of celebratory clips from the 1968 Democratic National Convention) mixed with more dissonant sounds accompanying pictures of poverty-stricken areas, soldiers wounded in Vietnam, and the recent unrest, including the riots at that same Convention.
The song was played in the pilot episode of The Brady Bunch Variety Hour

References

Bibliography

Further reading

External links

 Video.

Songs about cities
1896 songs
Spanish–American War
University of Wisconsin–Madison